One Good Turn is a 1936 British comedy film directed by Alfred J. Goulding and starring Leslie Fuller, Georgie Harris and Hal Gordon. It was shot at Elstree Studios near London. The film's sets were designed by the art director George Provis.

Synopsis
The screenplay concerns two coffee stall workers, who try to prevent their landlady's daughter being cheated by a villainous theatre producer.

Cast
 Leslie Fuller as Bill Parsons
 Georgie Harris as  Georgie
 Hal Gordon as Bert
 Molly Fisher as Dolly Pearson
 Basil Langton as Jack Pearson
 Clarissa Selwynne as Ma Pearson
 Faith Bennett as Violet
 Arthur Finn as Townsend
 Val Rosing as Vocalist 
 Syd Crossley as Griggs - Townsend's Manservant
 Frederick Piper as Sausage Sandwich Customer

References

Bibliography
 Low, Rachael. Filmmaking in 1930s Britain. George Allen & Unwin, 1985.
 Shafer, Stephen C. British Popular Films, 1929-1939: The Cinema of Reassurance. Routledge, 1997.
 Sutton, David R. A Chorus of Raspberries: British Film Comedy, 1929-1939. University of Exeter Press, 2000.
 Wood, Linda. British Films, 1927-1939. British Film Institute, 1986.

External links

1936 films
1936 comedy films
Films directed by Alfred J. Goulding
British comedy films
Films set in London
British black-and-white films
Films shot at Rock Studios
1930s English-language films
1930s British films